Jesse Francis "Jeff" Bingaman Jr. (born October 3, 1943) is an American academic and retired politician who represented New Mexico in the United States Senate for 30 years, from 1983 to 2013. A member of the Democratic Party, he previously served as the 25th Attorney General of New Mexico from 1979 to 1983. During his time in the Senate, Bingaman served as Chairman of Committee Outreach for the Senate Democratic Caucus and was the longtime chair of the Senate Energy Committee.

After he left the Senate, he returned to his alma mater Stanford Law School as a fellow of its Steyer–Taylor Center for Energy Policy and Finance.

Early life
Bingaman was born in El Paso, Texas, the son of Frances Bethia (née Ball) and Jesse Francis Bingaman. He grew up in Silver City, New Mexico. His father taught at Western New Mexico University and his mother taught in the public schools system. At age 15, he earned the rank of Eagle Scout.

After graduating from Silver High School in 1961, Bingaman went on to earn a Bachelor of Arts degree in government from Harvard College in 1965. He then entered Stanford Law School, graduating in 1968.

After his admission to the bar, Bingaman commenced work as a private practice attorney alongside his wife. He also served as counsel to the New Mexico Constitutional Convention of 1969. From 1968 to 1974, Bingaman was a member of the U.S. Army Reserve. He attended basic training at Fort Dix, New Jersey, as a private and graduated from the chaplain enlisted assistant technician course at the Army Chaplain School, Fort Hamilton, New Jersey in April 1969.

State Attorney General
Bingaman worked briefly in the state attorney general's office. He then ran for the leadership position of this office in 1978 and was elected. Environmental and antitrust issues were some of his biggest concerns while in this position.

U.S. Senate

Committee assignments
Committee on Armed Services
Subcommittee on Emerging Threats and Capabilities
Subcommittee on Personnel
Subcommittee on Strategic Forces
Committee on Energy and Natural Resources (Chairman)
Committee on Finance
Subcommittee on Health Care
Subcommittee on Energy, Natural Resources, and Infrastructure (Chairman)
Subcommittee on International Trade, Customs, and Global Competitiveness
Subcommittee on Fiscal Responsibility and Economic Growth
Committee on Health, Education, Labor, and Pensions
Subcommittee on Children and Families
Subcommittee on Primary Health and Aging
Joint Economic Committee

Caucus memberships
Congressional Competitiveness Caucus (Co-Chair)
International Conservation Caucus
Senate Diabetes Caucus

Tenure

In 1982, Bingaman was elected to the Senate, defeating one-term Republican incumbent Harrison Schmitt. Bingaman accused Schmitt of not paying enough attention to local matters; his campaign slogan was "What on Earth has he done for you lately?"—a jab at Schmitt's previous service as an astronaut who had walked on the Moon. He was reelected four times.

Bingaman was Chairman of the Energy and Natural Resources Committee and a member of the Finance Committee; Health, Education, Labor, and Pensions Committee; and Joint Committee on the Economy.

Generally, Bingaman kept a fairly low national profile, even though he was the ninth most senior member of the Senate at the time of his retirement. He was very popular in New Mexico, facing substantive opposition only once, in 1994.

Bingaman and his Senate colleague Pete Domenici were the longest-serving duo among senators in the 110th United States Congress (2007–2009). In second place were Ted Kennedy and John Kerry of Massachusetts. Due to serving alongside Domenici, the longest-serving Senator in New Mexico's history, Bingaman spent 26 years as New Mexico's junior Senator, though ironically he had more seniority than all but a few of his colleagues. He was the most-senior junior senator in the 110th United States Congress.

On April 28, 2008, Bingaman endorsed Senator Barack Obama for the 2008 Democratic presidential nomination.

On February 18, 2011, Bingaman announced that he would not seek reelection in 2012. He formally retired on January 3, 2013, ending the second-longest Senate tenure in the state's history, behind only Domenici.

Political positions

Immigration
Being from a border state with Mexico, Bingaman was highly involved in the debate over illegal immigration. He believed in increased enforcement of borders to stem the flow of illegal immigrants, including more patrol agents and the use of surveillance cameras. However, he also believed that the U.S. should enact a guest worker program so that immigrants looking for honest work could arrive legally. Bingaman voted against the Secure Fence Act in 2006. He voted against declaring English to be the official language of the US government and voted in favor of continuing federal funds to self-declared "sanctuary cities".

Energy and the environment
Throughout his political career, Bingaman had a pro-environmental record. He worked consistently to protect wildlife and public lands. He spoke publicly about the necessity of the Clean Energy Act of 2007, citing the importance of developing clean technology and green jobs. He stated his support for the bill's principle of eliminating tax breaks on gas and oil companies.

Starting in 2006, Bingaman worked unsuccessfully to pass a bill that would have reduced greenhouse gas emissions via a "cap and trade" system. He stated his hope of reducing emissions to 1990 levels by 2030. His bill would also have increased federal funding for research and development of green technologies.

Social issues
Bingaman voted in line with the majority of his party on abortion, and he received a 100% rating from the pro-choice NARAL. He supported reinstatig the Fairness Doctrine. Although he voted in 1996 for the Defense of Marriage Act, he voted against a proposed constitutional amendment to ban gay marriage, and was ranked favorably by gay rights groups (such as 89% from the Human Rights Campaign). He also voted twice against a proposed amendment to ban flag desecration, and supported affirmative action.

Iraq War
On October 11, 2002, Jeff Bingaman was among the 23 Senators who did not vote for authorizing the Iraq War.

Crime and torture
Bingaman had a generally pro-rehabilitation stance on crime, supporting more programs to prevent youth crime, lower high school dropout rates, and stop drug use. Bingaman was an outspoken critic of the Guantanamo Bay detention camp. He cited the need for due process of law for detainees by saying:

The current practice of holding detainees or prisoners indefinitely, without affording them basic due process rights, has been widely criticized in this country and throughout the world. For a country such as ours that has consistently advocated for the rule of law, the policies of the current administration are nothing short of a major embarrassment ... How we handle prisoners can have a dramatic impact on how our own men and women are treated in the event they are themselves taken prisoner.

Health care reform
Bingaman supported President Barack Obama's health reform legislation; he voted for the Patient Protection and Affordable Care Act in December 2009, and voted for the Health Care and Education Reconciliation Act of 2010.

Electoral history
2006 United States Senate election in New Mexico
Jeff Bingaman (D) (inc.), 70.6%
Allen McCulloch (R), 29.3%
Orlin G. Cole, 0.06%
2000 United States Senate election in New Mexico
Jeff Bingaman (D) (inc.), 61.7%
Bill Redmond (R), 38.25%
Orlin G. Cole, 0.04%
1994 United States Senate election in New Mexico
Jeff Bingaman (D) (inc.), 53.97%
Colin R. McMillan (R), 45.99%
1988 United States Senate election in New Mexico
Jeff Bingaman (D) (inc.), 63.2%
Bill Valentine (R), 36.8%
1982 United States Senate election in New Mexico
Jeff Bingaman (D), 53.8%
Harrison Schmitt (R) (inc.), 46.2%

Personal life
Bingaman met his wife Anne Kovacovich when both were attending Stanford Law School. They have one son, John, who served as the chief of staff for New Mexico Governor Michelle Lujan Grisham (2019-2020).

Awards and honors
On December 13, 2008, Bingaman was awarded an honorary Doctor of Letters degree from New Mexico State University at the university's Fall 2008 commencement ceremony.

He received the Distinguished Eagle Scout Award from the Boy Scouts of America.

Footnotes

External links

United States Senator Jeff Bingaman official U.S. Senate website

|-

|-

|-

|-

|-

|-

1943 births
Living people
21st-century American politicians
American United Methodists
Democratic Party United States senators from New Mexico
Harvard College alumni
Military personnel from New Mexico
New Mexico Attorneys General
New Mexico Democrats
New Mexico lawyers
Politicians from El Paso, Texas
People from Silver City, New Mexico
Stanford Law School alumni
United States Army soldiers
United States Army reservists